Virginia Western Community College (VWCC) is a public community college in Roanoke, Virginia. It is part of the Virginia Community College System.

Students
As of 2020, Virginia Western has over 12,000 students enrolled in the college and over half of these students are from Roanoke City or Roanoke County. Currently enrolled there are 54% female and 46% male. Most of the students are part-time enrollment. Virginia Western Community College now has student sports teams such as basketball and soccer. The college also has many student clubs and recreations for students.

In the fall 2020 semester, VWCC's total headcount was 8,362 students, 57% female, 43% male. The racial makeup of the student body is 70% White, 20% Black or African American, and 5% from other races.

Academics
As of 2013, Virginia Western has 69 different specified programs that fall under the categories including: Associate of Arts, Associate of Applied Science, Associate of Science, Certificate, or Career Studies. Some of these degrees are used as a stepping stone to many of Virginia's four year universities.

Virginia Western Community College offers 23 associate degree programs.

Notable alumni 
Carol M. Swain (born 1954) Law Professor, U.S. Civil Rights Commission Advisory Committee.

Barry Michaels (born 1952) radio disc jockey.

Faculty

Facilities
Culinary Institute at Virginia Western is in the Claude Moore Education Complex, in downtown Roanoke

The college operates the Greenfield Education & Training Center in Daleville.

The Roanoke Japanese Saturday School (ロノアーク補習授業校 Ronōaku Hoshū Jugyō Kō), a weekend Japanese educational program, was previously held at the Greenfield Education & Training Center. It was closed for an indeterminate period in April 2006, and in February 2009 it was closed permanently.

See also
John Edwards Public Service Award recipient from the Madison Society of Virginia Western Community College (2009).
Fralin Futures scholarship
Goodwill Scholarships

References

External links
Official website

1966 establishments in Virginia
Educational institutions established in 1966
Virginia Community College System
Two-year colleges in the United States
Education in Roanoke, Virginia
Universities and colleges accredited by the Southern Association of Colleges and Schools